is a railway station located in the city of Jōetsu, Niigata, Japan.

Lines

Station layout
The station has one side platform serving a single bi-directional track. The station is unattended.

Adjacent stations

History
The station opened on 22 March 1997 with the opening of the Hokuhoku Line.

Passenger statistics
In fiscal 2015, the station was used by an average of 155 passengers daily (boarding passengers only).

Surroundings area
former Uragawara village hall

References

External links
 Hokuetsu Express station information 

Railway stations in Niigata Prefecture
Railway stations in Japan opened in 1997
Stations of Hokuetsu Express
Jōetsu, Niigata